Leonardo Mayer was the defending champion but chose not to defend his title.

Roberto Carballés Baena won the title after defeating Guillermo García López 6–4, 2–6, 6–2 in the final.

Seeds

Draw

Finals

Top half

Bottom half

References
Main Draw
Qualifying Draw

Antonio Savoldi–Marco Cò – Trofeo Dimmidisì - Singles
2017 Singles